Harry Jac Lehman (August 24, 1935 – October 5, 2022) was an American politician who served as a member of the Ohio House of Representatives. He was the plaintiff in Lehman v. City of Shaker Heights, a case brought before the United States Supreme Court in which the court affirmed that the city was not required to carry Lehman's campaign ads in advertising space made available on public transit.

Lehman was born in Dayton, Ohio and served in the United States Army. He graduated from Amherst College and Harvard Law School. He died on October 5, 2022, at the age of 87.

References 

1935 births
2022 deaths
Politicians from Dayton, Ohio
Military personnel from Ohio
Amherst College alumni
Harvard Law School alumni
Democratic Party members of the Ohio House of Representatives
Ohio State University faculty
Ohio lawyers